The German Armed Forces Badge for Weapons Proficiency is a decoration of the Bundeswehr, the armed forces of the Federal Republic of Germany.

The decoration is awarded to German military personnel of all grades but is only allowed to be worn by enlisted members. The German armed forces regulations point out that "the Schützenschnur is a decoration for weapons proficiency for enlisted soldiers." Officers can receive the award, although it is not currently authorized to be worn on their uniforms. Foreign military members also may be awarded the badge.  The German military regulation on officers still applies, permitting only enlisted members to wear the badge.

History

The history of the Schützenschnur dates back to the Eighty Years' War where Spanish troops were ordered to hang any Dutch person who carried a musket. Therefore Spanish musketeers began to carry ropes which were often carried over one shoulder.
Awarding a cord as a decoration began in the early 18th century in Prussia under Frederick William I of Prussia.

With the reorganization of the Prussian Army under Gerhard von Scharnhorst the Schützenschnur became an official military award.

The Reichswehr and later the Wehrmacht adapted the Schützenschnur as an award for proficiency in marksmanship. The award existed in 12 different levels with different versions for infantry and armored troops.

In 1957 the Bundesgrenzschutz introduced the Schützenschnur.

A similar decoration existed within the East German National People's Army and the Border Troops of the German Democratic Republic.

Requirements for qualification 
To earn the award one must successfully shoot weapons from all three classes:

 Pistol (current service pistol is the P8)
 Rifle (there are several rifles in service, the standard rifle is the G36)
 Heavy weapon (for example machine gun (MG3) or antitank launcher (Panzerfaust 3)

The awarded grade is determined by the lowest weapon qualification (e.g. if you qualify all gold and one bronze, you are awarded the bronze.).

Classes/grades 

 German Armed Forces Badge for Weapons Proficiency in Bronze (Schützenschnur in Bronze) is awarded for shooting with the rifle and the pistol and the machine pistol with at least two scores in at least bronze (medical service at least one score in at least bronze). The admissible categories of weapon depends on the branch of the service member.  The category of heavy weapons (most commonly the machine gun) is not mandatory to earn the bronze badge. The rifle, pistol and machine pistol are the only weapons that require minimally score of bronze.
 German Armed Forces Badge for Weapons Proficiency in Silver (Schützenschnur in Silber) is awarded for shooting by a service member with his designated "light" weapon (pistol, rifle or machine pistol) and one of the "heavy" weapons (machine gun or Panzerfaust) with all scores at least in silver.
 German Armed Forces Badge for Weapons Proficiency in Gold (Schützenschnur in Gold) is awarded for shooting by a service member with his designated "light" weapon (pistol, rifle or machine pistol) and one of the "heavy" weapons (machine gun or Panzerfaust) with all scores at least in gold.

The number of exercises depends on the chosen (or ordered) weapon and the grade of the badge. A member of the medical branch, for example, can reach the bronze badge by two exercises with the pistol. A paratrooper needs for the gold badge one exercise with the G36 rifle (or three with the G3 rifle) AND two with the MG3 machine gun (or two with the Panzerfaust).

The German Armed Forces Badge for Weapons Proficiency in Gold is awarded with the number 5, 10, 15 etc. for annually retaking.

Design 
The Army and Air Forces version of the award is a silver colored rope with a round metal badge on a flat end near the top of the rope, on its center it displays the German eagle surrounded by a wreath of oak leaves.
The Navy version of the award looks the same except the rope's color is navy blue.

See also 
Awards and decorations of the German Armed Forces
German Armed Forces Badge for Military Proficiency

References 

Military awards and decorations of Germany (Bundeswehr)
Braids